or Miyazaki Peace Park is a municipal park in Miyazaki, Miyazaki on Japan's Kyushu Island.  A popular honeymoon destination for Japanese couples, the park's Peace Tower has generated controversy because of its place in Japanese history.

Park description
Heiwadai Park is located in the Shimokitagata-cho region of Miyazaki City. The park houses the Miyazaki Shrine, which is devoted to Emperor Jimmu who by legend is from the Miyazaki region.

History
The park was constructed in 1939 to commemorate the 2600th anniversary of Japan's Imperial establishment.  The Hakko Ichiu tower, later renamed the Peace Tower, was built in 1940.  When princess Takako Shimazu honeymooned there in 1960, the park became a favorite destination for Japanese newlyweds.  Hibiya Park was designated Heiwadai's sister park in 1965, in a ceremony in which Heiwadai received doves from Hibiya.

Haniwa Garden

The Haniwa Garden,  in size, is located north of the Peace Tower.  A central feature of the Haniwa Garden is more than 400 haniwa (terracotta clay figures) which are placed along paths within the garden.  These are earthenware replicas of burial haniwa originally excavated at the site.  These figures take the form of animals, boats, dancers, houses, and warriors.

Peace Tower

A  tower was constructed in 1940 to memorialize the installment of Japan's first emperor, Jimmu.  The original name was Hakkō ichiu Tower, meaning "Eight World Regions Under One Roof," a slogan of the Imperial Japanese Army.  Designed by Jitsuzo Hinago, the tower was created from stones gathered from around the then-current extent of the Japanese empire at a cost of 670,000 yen.  The writing "Hakkō ichiu" was removed after the Japanese defeat at the insistence of the U.S. military.  The tower was the inception point for the torch relay of the 1964 Summer Olympics.  Subsequent to the Olympics, which coincided with worldwide interest in the Japanese Imperial family, the local tourism association successfully petitioned the Miyazaki Prefecture to re-install the "Hakkō ichiu" characters.

The tower has been a point of some controversy, as many Japanese citizens wonder how a structure created specifically to convey Japanese might during a period of conquest can now be a symbol for peace.  Some people consider the lack of documentation regarding the militaristic genesis of the tower to subtract from the structure's re-imagined power as a symbol for peace.  Other survivors of the period have stated that the tower allows the horrors of war to be passed down through generations.

References

Parks and gardens in Miyazaki Prefecture
1939 establishments in Japan
Miyazaki (city)
Parks established in 1939